Peter Zander may refer to:

Peter Zander (actor) (1922–2019), German-born British actor
Peter Zander (politician) (1832–1884), American politician